Bengkulu, formerly Bencoolen (Dutch: Benkoelen) is the capital of the Indonesian province of Bengkulu. The city is the second largest city on the west coast of Sumatra Island after Padang. Previously this area was under the influence of the kingdom of Inderapura and the Sultanate of Banten. The city also became the exile of Sukarno during the period of 1939 - 1942. It covers an area of 151.70 km2 and had a population of 308,544 at the 2010 Census and 373,591 at the 2020 Census. The city is also the largest city of Bengkulu Province.

History

The British East India Company founded Bengkulu (named Bencoolen by the British), in 1685, as their new commercial centre for the region.  In the 17th century, the British East India Company controlled the spice trade in the Lampung region of southern Sumatra from a port in Banten, in the north west of the neighbouring island of Java. In 1682, a troop of the Dutch East India Company attacked Banten. The local crown prince submitted to the Dutch, who then recognised him as Sultan. The Dutch expelled all other Europeans present in Banten, leading the British to establish Bengkulu.  In 1714, the British built Fort Marlborough at Bengkulu.

The trading centre was never financially viable, because of its remoteness and the difficulty in procuring pepper. Despite these difficulties, the British persisted, maintaining a presence there for over a century, ceding it to the Dutch as part of the Anglo-Dutch Treaty of 1824 to focus their attention on Malacca. Edmund Roberts, the first U.S. envoy to the Far East, visited Bengkulu in 1832. Like the rest of present-day Indonesia, Bengkulu remained a Dutch colony until World War II.

Sukarno (later the first president of Indonesia) was imprisoned by the Dutch in the 1930s, including a brief period in Bengkulu. Sukarno met his future wife, Fatmawati, during his time in Bengkulu.

Geography
The region is at low elevation and can have swamps. In the mid 19th century, malaria and related diseases were common. Bengkulu lies near the Sunda Fault and is prone to earthquakes and tsunamis. The June 2000 Enggano earthquake killed at least 100 people. A recent report predicts that Bengkulu is "at risk of inundation over the next few decades from undersea earthquakes predicted along the coast of Sumatra" A series of earthquakes struck Bengkulu during September 2007, killing 13 people.
Bengkulu City has an area of 151.70 km ², and is located on the west coast of Sumatra island, with the province having a coastline about 525 km in length. The area of this city lies parallel to the mountains of Bukit Barisan and face to face with the Indian Ocean.

Administrative districts
The City of Bengkulu comprised eight administrative districts (kecamatan) at the time of the 2010 Census, but subsequently a ninth district (Singaran Pati) was formed out of the northwest half of the existing Gading Cempaka District. The districts are listed below with their areas and their populations at the 2010 Census and the 2020 Census. The table also includes the numbers of administrative villages (urban kelurahan and rural desa) in each district.

Note: (a) the 2010 population of the new Singaran Piti District is included in the figure for Gading Cempaka District, from which it was later split off.

Climate
Bengkulu has a tropical rainforest climate (Af) with very heavy rainfall year-round.

Governance
Based on Emergency Law Number 6 Year 1956, Bengkulu was one of the Small Town with an area of 17.6 km2 in South Sumatera province . The mention of this Small Town then changed to Kotamadya based on Law No. 1 of 1957 on the subject of local government. After the issuance of Law Number 9 Year 1967 regarding the establishment of Bengkulu Province, Bengkulu Municipality as well as being the capital for the province. However, the law only came into force on 1 June 1968 after the issuance of Government Regulation No. 20/1968.

Based on the Decree of the Provincial Governor of Bengkulu No. 821.27-039 dated 22 January 1981, the Municipality of Bengkulu was subsequently divided into two districts namely Teluk Segara District and Gading Cempaka District. With the enactment of Decree of Mayor of Bengkulu Region No. 440 and 444 of 1981 and reinforced by the Decree of the Governor of Bengkulu No. 141 of 1982 on 1 October 1982, the mention of the territory of Kedatukan was erased and Pemangkuan became kelurahan. Furthermore, based on Government Regulation No. 41 of 1982, Bengkulu Region Second Level Region consists of 2 Definitive Districts with Teluk Segara District overseeing 17 villages and Gading Cempaka District overseeing 21 urban villages. Then based on Government Regulation No. 46 of 1986, the area of Bengkulu Municipality was increased to 151.7 km2 and consisted of four districts, comprising 38 urban villages (kelurahan) and 17 rural villages (desa). Another five districts were later added by splitting these four.

Historically, there was a court where all legal investigations passed through. Criminals who were sentenced to death had copies of their trials sent to Java for review.

Transportation 
Bengkulu is connected by road, air and sea. There are several public transportation modes in Bengkulu such as taxi, angkot (mini-van), ojek (motorcycle taxi).

Airport 
The city is served by the newly renovated Fatmawati Soekarno Airport. There is one terminal building for both international and domestic flights.

Harbour 
Bengkulu's harbour, known locally as Pulau Bai, serves inter-island as well as International routes. The ferry terminal is the access point to Enggano Island.

Demographics
As of 1832, the population of Bengkulu, and its surrounding area, was estimated at 18,000 people. During that time, the region had a varied population: Dutch, Chinese, Javanese, Indians, and more. Chinatown was located in the centre of the city.

Economy
When under Dutch rule, Bengkulu had plantations. Parsi people harvested and processed nutmeg and mace. The nutmeg would be processed into confectionery products. Pepper was a large export, too. The area also produced smaller amounts of coffee and rice, however, both were primarily imported from Padang. Fruit and animal production was also significant.

Tourism

In this city there are several British heritage buildings and fortresses, including Fort Marlborough, founded in 1713 on Long Beach, Hamilton Monument and Thomas Parr Monument in the downtown area, Sukarno's exile house on Soekarno-Hatta Street, and Jamik Mosque designed by Ir. Sukarno.
Bengkulu City also has a number of other mainstay attractions, such as Chinatown, Tapak Paderi Beach, Jakat Beach, Dendam Tak Sudah Lake and Pulau Baai Harbor . Not only that, a number of culinary potential of Bengkulu City is also interesting. Some of them such as Pendap, Lempuk Durian, Pondok Durian Bengkulu, Bai Tat, and so forth.
One of which can be a reference to shop for souvenirs, the traveler can go to the area Anggut Bengkulu City. This area has been set local government into a typical souvenir center .
And for those of you who love durian, Bengkulu City also has a variety of durian processed hunting spots. This can be found in Pondok Durian Bengkulu. In this outlet travelers can enjoy processed Durian ranging from durian ice cream and a variety of variants, durian toast, pancake durian, durian pancakes and so forth.

Culture
Each year, in the Muslim month of Muharram, Bengkulu hosts the ceremony Tabot. The two centuries old ritual was made by artisans from Madras in India for the construction of Fort Marlborough. It celebrates the martyrdom of Imam Shiite Hussein's death at the Battle of Karbala. The Tabot is an opportunity for a grand procession, accompanied by songs and dances performed by young girls.

Education
As of 1832, the city had two Lancasterian method Dutch schools. At one school, students were taught math, religion and the Malay language. The students frequently used a Malay version of The New Testament to learn Malayan, which was created by Robert Boyle when the British occupied Bengkulu. The other school was at an orphanage.

In this town lies the only state university in the province of Bengkulu, the Universitas Bengkulu (UNIB).

See also

 Selebar

References

Bibliography

 Ricklefs, M. C., A History of Modern Indonesia since c. 1300 (2de édition), 1993

 
Populated places established in 1685
1685 establishments in the British Empire